Jan Kozakiewicz (born 24 February 1996) is a Polish swimmer and national record holder in 50 metre breaststroke. He finished in fourth place in the men's 50 metre breaststroke event at the 2020 European Aquatics Championships, in Budapest, Hungary.

References

External links
 

1996 births
Living people
Polish male breaststroke swimmers
Place of birth missing (living people)
Olympic swimmers of Poland
Swimmers at the 2020 Summer Olympics
20th-century Polish people
21st-century Polish people